Armor of Light is the sixteenth studio album by the American heavy metal band Riot, now called Riot V, released on April 27, 2018, through Nuclear Blast Records. It is Riot's second album not featuring long-time guitarist and founder, Mark Reale who died in 2012.

Track listing

Personnel

Band members
 Todd Michael Hall – lead vocals
 Mike Flyntz – guitar
 Nick Lee – guitar
 Don Van Stavern – bass
 Frank Gilchriest – drums

Production
 Chris Collier – production, mastering
 Bruno Ravel – co-production, engineering
 Mariusz Gandzel – artwork
 Timo Pollinger– artwork (additional), layout

Charts

References

2014 albums
Riot V albums
SPV/Steamhammer albums